Crocus hyemalis is a species of flowering plant in the family Iridaceae. It is referred to by the common name winter saffron and is native to Lebanon, the Palestine region and Syria.

References

hyemalis
Plants described in 1859
Taxa named by Pierre Edmond Boissier
Flora of Lebanon
Flora of Palestine (region)
Flora of Syria